Malta has competed in 17 Summer Olympic Games and 2 Winter Olympic Games.

As of the Beijing 2022 Olympic Games no Maltese competitor has won an Olympic medal. However shooter William Chetcuti (who has won World Championship events) missed the Double Trap Shooting final in 2004, 2008 and 2012 by a relatively slim margin. In 2004 and 2008 Chetcuti was tied for 6th (the required placing to enter the final), but lost at a tie breaker. 
Elise Pellegrin is the first Winter Olympian to represent the country, in 2014 Winter Olympics in Sochi.

The Maltese Olympic Committee was formed in 1928 and recognized by the IOC in 1936.

Medal tables

Medals by Summer Games

Medals by Winter Games

See also
 List of flag bearers for Malta at the Olympics
 :Category:Olympic competitors for Malta
 Malta at the Paralympics

References

External links